Hibbertia echiifolia is a species of flowering plant in the family Dilleniaceae and is endemic to northern Australia. It is a variable shrub with elliptic to lance-shaped or oblong leaves and yellow flowers arranged singly in leaf axils, with twenty-nine to forty-five stamens arranged around the three carpels.

Description
There are twenty-nine to forty-five stamens of differing lengths arranged in groups around the three carpels, each carpel with two ovules. Flowering occurs from April to July.

Taxonomy and naming
Hibbertia echiifolia was first formally described in 1863 by George Bentham in Flora Australiensis from an unpublished description by Robert Brown. The specific epithet (echiifolia) means "leaves similar to those of plants in the genus Echium".

In 2010, Hellmut Toelken described five subspecies and the names are accepted by the Australian Plant Census:
 Hibbertia echiifolia subsp. oligantha Toelken is similar to subsp. echiifolia but with the outer sepal lobes distinctly shorter than the inner ones;

The subspecies' names (other than that of the autonym echiifolia) mean "drooping" (cernua), "large-flowered" (macrantha), "few-flowered" (oligantha) and "wheeled" (oligantha), the last referring to the wheel-like appearance of the hairs.

Distribution and habitat
This variable hibbertia occurs in the Kimberley region of Western Australia, the northern part of the Northern Territory on the Cape York Peninsula in Queensland. Subspecies cernua grows in scrub in Arnhem Land in the Northern Territory, subspecies echiifolia in heath in coastal areas of the northern Kimberley, north-eastern Northern Territory and Cape York Peninsula, macrantha in woodland, mainly in Arnhem Land, oligantha in rocky places in woodland in Arnhem Land and subspecies rotata in woodland on sandstones or scree slopes in Arnhem Land.

Conservation status
Goodenia echiifolia is classified as of "least concern" under the Northern Territory Government Territory Parks and Wildlife Conservation Act 1976 and as "not threatened" by the Western Australian Government Department of Parks and Wildlife.

See also
List of Hibbertia species

References

echiifolia
Flora of the Northern Territory
Flora of Queensland
Eudicots of Western Australia
Plants described in 1863
Taxa named by George Bentham